Architecture Brio is an international architecture firm based in Rotterdam and Mumbai founded in 2006. The team of architects is led by Shefali Balwani (Center for Environmental Planning and Technology, India) and Robert Verrijt (Technical University Delft, the Netherlands).

History
Architecture BRIO is a design studio focusing on the fields of architecture, interior, and sustainable design. The work of Architecture BRIO is characterized by a conceptual approach towards understanding and reinterpreting the specific context in which it is located. One of their first projects, a design proposal for a Dormitory at the Magic Bus Campus, is critically acclaimed and currently featured in the publication Architecture of Change. Architecture BRIO's work field spans over variety of cultures, climates, and landscapes through the Indian Subcontinent and South East Asia. The firm follows a design philosophy where each project is viewed as an opportunity to uncover the unique characteristics of these specific conditions. These investigations possess potential for positive change and impact in the way we deal with our natural and built world. The portfolio of the firm is significantly diverse, "with common themes that concern tectonics of site, formal and spatial explorations of architecture, critical reading of the program, systems thinking, and clarity of material and detail that have characterized their work." The work of Architecture BRIO has since been published world wide in national and international media. The Riparian House was featured in the BBC documentary series The World's Most Extraordinary Homes.

Awards
Architecture Brio has been the recipient of several prestigious awards. Robert Verrijt was awarded the second prize in the Dutch Archiprix 2004  for his design of an Asylum Seekers Centre in Maastricht. Together with Floris Cornelisse he won the first prize for the entry Triade in the Europan 8 Competition 2005. Besides this he has been awarded thrice a grant from The Netherlands Foundation for Visual Arts, Design and Architecture. The project House on a Stream which was completed in 2013 won the award for the best residential design at the NDTV Design and Architecture of the Year Awards 2013, the Trends Excellence Awards 2014, and the JKC Architecture of the Year Award 2014. The studio was selected amongst the AD50, the Architectural Digest India list of the most influential designers in India in 2014, and from 2016 to 2022. In 2021, the project Billion bricks Homes  won two awards across the Global and regional categories at the 6th International Holcim Awards for Sustainable Construction

References

Architecture firms of India
Companies based in Mumbai
Design companies established in 2006
2006 establishments in Maharashtra
Indian companies established in 2006

External links
Architecture BRIO website